Baker County Courthouse may refer to:

 Old Baker County Courthouse, Macclenny, Florida, US
 Baker County Courthouse (Georgia), US